Tatyana Sergeyevna Andryushina (born 26 June 1990) is a Russian épée fencer.

She won a bronze medal in the 2013 Havana Grand Prix. The same year, she took part in the World Championships in Budapest. She was defeated in the second round by eventual bronze medallist Emese Szász of Hungary. In the team event, she won the world team title with Russia.

References

External links
 
  (archive)
  (archive)
 

Russian female épée fencers
1990 births
Living people
People from Voskresensk
European Games competitors for Russia
Fencers at the 2015 European Games
Universiade medalists in fencing
Universiade bronze medalists for Russia
Sportspeople from Moscow Oblast
21st-century Russian women